Djuan Keila Trent (born November 20, 1986) is an American YouTube personality and former beauty pageant titleholder from Columbus, Georgia who was named Miss Kentucky 2010.

Biography
Trent won the title of Miss Kentucky on July 17, 2010, when she received her crown from outgoing titleholder Mallory Ervin. Trent was among the top ten in the Miss America 2011 pageant.

Trent publicly came out as gay with an announcement on her blog, "I am queer," on February 20, 2014. The self-described former student from a Southern Baptist conservative Christian school told The Huffington Post that she came out "to help foster visibility of young queer women of color."

Trent is an honorary co-chair of Southerners For the Freedom to Marry.

References

External links
 
 
  (Alternate)
 
 
 
 

1986 births
Living people
African-American female models
African-American models
American beauty pageant winners
American bloggers
American female models
American YouTubers
American women bloggers
Berea College alumni
Beauty pageants in Kentucky
LGBT people from Georgia (U.S. state)
LGBT African Americans
Miss America 2011 delegates
Miss Kentucky winners
People from Berea, Kentucky
People from Brooklyn
People from Columbus, Georgia
Queer women
Writers from Lexington, Kentucky
21st-century African-American women writers
21st-century American women writers
21st-century African-American writers
20th-century African-American people
21st-century American LGBT people
20th-century African-American women
Female models from Georgia (U.S. state)
Female models from Kentucky